Karate competitions at the 2023 Pan American Games in Santiago, Chile are scheduled to be held between November 3 and 5, 2023 at the Centro de deportes de contacto.

12 medal events will be contested. Ten of these events are in kumite (five per gender). A further two events (one per gender) in kata will be contested. A total of 106 athletes will qualify to compete at the games.

Qualification

A total of 106 karatekas will qualify to compete (96 qualified across four qualification tournaments and 10 extra nominal spots to the winners of the 2021 Junior Pan American Games. There will be nine athletes qualified in each individual event, excepting individual kata, which will feature eight athletes. Each nation may enter a maximum of 12 athletes (six per gender). This consists of a maximum of one athlete in the individual events (12). This rule does not apply to the winners of the 2021 Junior Pan American Games. The host nation, Chile, automatically qualifies the maximum number of athletes (12).

Venezuela, Panama and Colombia's athletes will be eligible to qualify through the 2023 Central American and Caribbean Championship, while Mexico will qualify through the North American Cup.

Participating nations
A total of 11 countries qualified athletes.

Medal summary

Medallists
Men's events

Women's events

References

Events at the 2023 Pan American Games
Pan American Games
2023